The secretary of justice is the head of the Department of Justice and is a member of the president's Cabinet.

The current secretary is Jesus Crispin Remulla, who assumed office on June 30, 2022.

List of secretaries of justice

See also

 Justice ministry
 Politics of the Philippines

References

External links
DOJ website

 
Philippines
Justice